Chile competed at the 2008 Summer Paralympics in Beijing, China. The country's delegation consisted of four competitors: two wheelchair tennis players, one track and field athlete, and one swimmer. Other members of the delegation included the President of the Paralympic Federation of Chile, Mario Quijada, the Mission Chief, Patricio Bowen, and Doctor Alberto Vargas. The group left for Beijing on September 1. Tennis player Robinson Méndez was the country's flag bearer in the opening ceremony.

In tennis, Méndez and Francisco Cayulef competed in both singles and doubles events. Runner Cristián Valenzuela participated in the 1500 metre race, and swimmer Macarena Quero took part in the 50 metre freestyle S10 event.

Athletics

Men

Swimming

Women

Wheelchair Tennis

Men

See also
Chile at the 2008 Summer Olympics

References

Nations at the 2008 Summer Paralympics
2008
Paralympics
Disability in Chile